Battelle Memorial Institute (more widely known as simply Battelle) is a private nonprofit applied science and technology development company headquartered in Columbus, Ohio. Battelle is a charitable trust organized as a nonprofit corporation under the laws of the State of Ohio and is exempt from taxation under Section 501(c)(3) of the Internal Revenue Code because it is organized for charitable, scientific and education purposes.

The institute opened in 1929 but traces its origins to the 1923 will of Ohio industrialist Gordon Battelle which provided for its creation and his mother Annie Maude Norton Battelle who left the bulk of the family fortune to the institute after her death in 1925. Originally focusing on contract research and development work in the areas of metals and material science, Battelle is now an international science and technology enterprise that explores emerging areas of science, develops and commercializes technology, and manages laboratories for customers.

Contract research business
Battelle serves the following:
 Agribusiness: cannabis research, encapsulation, formulation, environmental fate, spray drift and droplet characterization
 Ecology & Environment: scientific data packages for researchers, air, water and soil analysis, assessment and remediation
 Health: genomics, life sciences research, medical device development, neurotechnology, public health studies
 Materials Science: analytical chemistry, characterization, coatings, compounds and structures, corrosion studies, nanoparticles and materials
 National Security: aviation and aerospace technologies, chemical and biological defense systems, cyber innovations, ground tactical systems, maritime technologies
 Research Infrastructure: Biosafety Laboratory 3 (BSL3) operations, chemical demilitarization facilities, National Ecological Observatory Network, national laboratory management
 STEM Education: BattelleEd, STEMX, Battelle Arts Grant, STEM Learning Networks

In addition to its Columbus, Ohio headquarters, Battelle has offices in Aberdeen, Maryland; West Jefferson, Ohio; Seattle, Washington; Arlington, Virginia; Norwell, Massachusetts; Charlottesville, Virginia; Baltimore, Maryland; Boulder, Colorado; and Egg Harbor Township, New Jersey.

National laboratory management
In addition to operating its own research facilities, as of 2022, Battelle manages or co-manages on behalf of the United States Department of Energy the following national laboratories:
 Brookhaven National Laboratory (through Brookhaven Science Associates, LLC – a collaboration between Battelle and Stony Brook University)
 Idaho National Laboratory (through the Battelle Energy Alliance – a collaboration between Battelle, BWX Technologies, Inc., Washington Group International, Electric Power Research Institute and an alliance of universities)
 Lawrence Livermore National Laboratory (through Lawrence Livermore National Security, LLC – a collaboration between Battelle, BWX Technologies, Inc., Washington Group International, the University of California, Bechtel National, and The Texas A&M University System)
 Los Alamos National Laboratory (through Triad National Security, LLC – a collaboration between Battelle, the University of California, and The Texas A&M University System)
 National Renewable Energy Laboratory (in partnership with MRIGlobal as part of the Alliance for Sustainable Energy, LLC)
 Oak Ridge National Laboratory (through UT-Battelle, LLC – a collaboration between Battelle and the University of Tennessee)
 Pacific Northwest National Laboratory
 Savannah River National Laboratory (through the Battelle Savannah River Alliance)

Additionally, on behalf of the Department of Homeland Security:
 National Biodefense Analysis and Countermeasures Center

National Science Foundation projects:
 In March 2016, Battelle was selected to manage the completion of the National Ecological Observatory Network (NEON) for the National Science Foundation.

Notable projects

In the 1940s, Battelle's Vice-President of Engineering, John Crout made it possible for Battelle researchers, including William Bixby and Paul Andrus, to develop Chester Carlson's concept of dry copying.  Carlson had been turned down for funding by more than a dozen agencies including the U.S. Navy.  Work led to the first commercial xerographic equipment, and to the formation of Xerox corporation.

Battelle also developed the first nuclear fuel rods for nuclear reactors, numerous advances in metallurgy that helped advance the United States space program, algorithms and coatings that led to the first optical digital recorder developed by James Russell, which paved the way for the first compact disc, and the first generation jet engines using titanium alloys.

Other advances included the armor plating for tanks in World War II; Snopake, the first correction fluid, developed in 1955; the fuel for the first nuclear submarine, the USS Nautilus (SSN-571); development of the Universal Product Code in 1965; cruise control for automobiles in 1970; and the first all-sputtered photovoltaic cell for solar energy in 1974. In 1987, PIRI, a fiber optics venture with Mitsubishi and NTT, was launched, which resulted in a $1.8 billion market. In conjunction with Kevin M. Amula, Battelle Geneva developed "No-melt" chocolate in 1988.

Battelle has made numerous medical advances, including a 1972 breakthrough development of special tubing to prevent blood clots during surgical procedures, and more recently, the development of reusable insulin injection pen, including dose memory, with Eli Lilly and Co.

Battelle was the contractor for a computer system on which the Voter News Service relied for tallying exit polling data in the November 2002 U.S. Congressional and Senate elections; the system failed and results were not reported until ten months after the election. The failure led to the disbanding of the VNS and the formation of its replacement, the National Election Pool.

In April 2020, Battelle Memorial Institute partnered with Ohio State University to distribute rapid tests for Covid-19, with results in less than 5 hours.

On March 29, 2020, Battelle announced that it had received an Emergency Use Authorization to deploy a system to decontaminate N95 respirators for healthcare providers. Battelle received a $400 million contract from the Defense Logistics Agency for the project, known as the Critical Care Decontamination System (CCDS). Following the conclusion of the program in May 2021, Battelle invoiced $155 million, with 5 million masks decontaminated and an average cost of $31 per mask.

Battelle Center for Science and Technology Policy (OSU/Glenn)

Battelle provides funds for a public policy research center at the John Glenn College of Public Affairs of Ohio State University to focus on scholarly questions associated with science and technology policy. The Battelle Center for Science and Technology Policy began official operation in July 2011.

Nonprofit status
From 1969 to 1975, the institute was involved in a lawsuit over whether it was "neglecting its philanthropic promises" as a nonprofit organization. It reached an $80 million settlement in 1975, used to demolish Union Station, build Battelle Hall at the Columbus Convention Center, refurbish the Ohio Theatre and create Battelle-Darby Creek Metro Park. The institute lost its nonprofit status in the 1990s, though regained it by 2001.

See also
 Chester Carlson
 John Crout
 Raymond Davis, Jr.
 Top 100 US Federal Contractors
 Future Attribute Screening Technology (FAST)

References

External links

 
90 Year History of Battelle website
 
 

 
Companies based in the Columbus, Ohio metropolitan area
Historic American Engineering Record in Ohio
Research institutes in Ohio
Multidisciplinary research institutes
Science and technology think tanks
1929 establishments in Ohio
University District (Columbus, Ohio)